Justice was the weekly newspaper of the Social Democratic Federation (SDF) in the United Kingdom.

The SDF was the Democratic Federation until January 1884.  With the name change the organisation launched the newspaper.

The paper was initially edited by C. L. Fitzgerald, and later by H. M. Hyndman, Henry Hyde Champion, Ernest Belfort Bax, then Harry Quelch for many years, and finally Henry W. Lee.  It attempted to present scholarly ideas in a serious fashion, featuring work by William Morris, Peter Kropotkin, Edward Aveling and Alfred Russel Wallace.

After the SDF became the British Socialist Party, in 1911, Justice continued as the weekly publication of that party, but in 1916, the group around Justice split away to form the National Socialist Party.  The paper then became the organ of that party, which soon joined the Labour Party and renamed itself the Social Democratic Federation again.  In 1925 Justice was renamed the Social Democrat and became a monthly. It was edited by William Sampson Cluse until its demise in 1933.

Editors
1884: C. L. Fitzgerald
1884: H. M. Hyndman
1886: Harry Quelch
1889: H. M. Hyndman
1891: Harry Quelch
1913: Henry W. Lee
1923: Tom Kennedy
1929: Walton Newbold
1931: William Sampson Cluse

References

External links
 Justice Internet Archive at Marxists Internet Archive. Links to a large number of articles from Justice, 1884–1914. Retrieved October 1, 2009.

Publications established in 1884
Publications disestablished in 1933
British Socialist Party
Social Democratic Federation
Socialist newspapers published in the United Kingdom
1884 establishments in the United Kingdom
1933 disestablishments in the United Kingdom